John David Hill (born 3 December 1949), Australian politician, represented the electoral district of Kaurna in the South Australian House of Assembly for the Labor Party from 1997 to 2014.

Born in Sydney, Hill attended the University of Sydney and graduated with a Bachelor of Arts. He moved to South Australia in 1974 and became a teacher. He also studied at the University of Adelaide and received his law degree.

Following a brief stint as a ministerial adviser during the Bannon Government, Hill became a party official, becoming State Secretary in 1994. He was elected to Parliament as member for Kaurna at the 1997 state election.

After Labor won the 2002 election, Hill became a minister in the Rann Government.  Initially given the portfolios of Minister for Environment and Conservation, Minister for the River Murray, Minister for the Southern Suburbs, Minister Assisting the Premier in the Arts and Minister for Gambling, Hill gained his current portfolios after a number of cabinet reshuffles.

The 2006 election saw Hill gain a swing of 11.0% to a total margin of 22.0%.

Hill did not re-contest his seat at the 2014 election.

Hill is a member of the Ministers' Club at EPODE International Network – the world's largest obesity-prevention network.

John Hill's political memoir, On Being a Minister - Behind the Mask, was published in February 2016.

External links

See also
EPODE International Network, the world's largest obesity-prevention network

References

 

1949 births
Living people
Members of the South Australian House of Assembly
University of Sydney alumni
Adelaide Law School alumni
Australian Labor Party members of the Parliament of South Australia
21st-century Australian politicians